Ratana Techamaneewat, also known as Chanungarn Techamaneewat, is a Thai wheelchair tennis player.

Techamaneewat competed at the 2004 Paralympic Games where she won a silver medal in the women's doubles event. She also competed at the 2012 Paralympic Games.

References

External links
 
 

Year of birth missing (living people)
Living people
Ratana Techamaneewat
Ratana Techamaneewat
Ratana Techamaneewat
Ratana Techamaneewat
Paralympic medalists in wheelchair tennis
Medalists at the 2004 Summer Paralympics
Wheelchair tennis players at the 2004 Summer Paralympics
Wheelchair tennis players at the 2012 Summer Paralympics
Ratana Techamaneewat
Ratana Techamaneewat